Colonel José Rivas ( 1823) was a Central American military officer. He served as the military commander of the Consultive Junta from 25 May to 17 June 1823.

References 

Date of birth missing
Date of death missing
Salvadoran military personnel